2021–22 Croatian Third Football League, also known as 3. HNL 2021–2022, was the 31st edition of the third tier of Croatian football league and the last at that level.

East

North

First phase

Second phase

Promotion group

Relegation group

South

Center

West

Promotion play-offs

Relegation play-offs

Second Football League (Croatia)
Croatia
3